South Pemiscot County R-V School District, also known as South Pemiscot Schools, is a school district headquartered in Steele, Missouri.

It includes Steele, Denton, and Holland.

Schools:
 South Pemiscot High School
 Central Elementary School
 East Elementary School

References

External links
 South Pemiscot Schools

Education in Pemiscot County, Missouri
School districts in Missouri